Tourkoleka is a settlement in the municipal unit of Falaisia, southwest Arcadia, Greece. It is situated in the mountains near the border with Messenia, at about 800 m elevation. It is 5 km west of Kamara, 6 km northeast of Pefko (Messenia), 8 km southwest of Leontari and 17 km south of Megalopoli. In 2011 Tourkoleka had a population of 190. Every August, Tourkoleka celebrates its Nikitareia festival in honour of Nikitaras, a Greek revolutionary leader. There is a marble statue of Nikitaras in the village.

Population

See also
List of settlements in Arcadia

References

External links
History and information about Tourkolekas
Tourkolekas GTP Travel Pages

Falaisia
Populated places in Arcadia, Peloponnese